Warrah Shire was a local government area in the Hunter region of New South Wales, Australia.

Warrah Shire was proclaimed on 7 March 1906, one of 134 shires created after the passing of the Local Government (Shires) Act 1905. 

The shire office was in Murrurundi. 

Warrah Shire amalgamated with the Municipality of Murrurundi to form Murrurundi Shire on 1 October 1948.

References

Former local government areas of New South Wales
1906 establishments in Australia
1948 disestablishments in Australia